Trevor Karg (born 10 October 1951) is a South African former cricketer. He played in seven first-class matches for Eastern Province between 1977/78 and 1979/80.

See also
 List of Eastern Province representative cricketers

References

External links
 

1951 births
Living people
South African cricketers
Eastern Province cricketers
People from Cradock, Eastern Cape
Cricketers from the Eastern Cape